Fernando Ariel Wilhelm (born 5 April 1982) is a former Argentine professional futsal player who played as a forward.

In 2016, he won the FIFA Futsal World Cup with Argentina and was awarded the competition's Golden Ball.

Honours

Club
Benfica
Taça de Portugal de Futsal: 2016–17
Supertaça de Portugal: 2015, 2016

International
Argentina
FIFA Futsal World Cup: 2016
Copa América de Futsal: 2003, 2015
Futsal Confederations Cup: 2014

Individual
FIFA Futsal World Cup Golden Ball: 2016

References

External links
Benfica official profile 

1982 births
Living people
Sportspeople from Buenos Aires
Argentine people of German descent
Futsal forwards
Argentine men's futsal players
S.L. Benfica futsal players
Argentine expatriate sportspeople in Portugal
Pan American Games silver medalists for Argentina
Futsal players at the 2007 Pan American Games
Medalists at the 2007 Pan American Games
Pan American Games medalists in futsal